The 1974–75 Sussex County Football League season was the 50th in the history of Sussex County Football League a football competition in England.

Division One

Division One featured 13 clubs which competed in the division last season, along with two new clubs, promoted from Division Two:
Three Bridges
Wigmore Athletic

League table

Division Two

Division Two featured nine clubs which competed in the division last season, along with three new clubs:
Crowborough Athletic
Rye United, relegated from Division One
Shoreham, relegated from Division One

League table

References

1974-75
1974–75 in English football leagues